Jesus Price Supastar is the second solo studio album by American rapper Sean Price of Heltah Skeltah and Boot Camp Clik. Originally planned to be released on September 19, 2006, it was pushed back to October 31, and then was pushed back for the third time, to a final release date on January 30, 2007. Duck Down Music CEO Drew "Dru-Ha" Friedman stated, "We all just decided together that the extra time would do us right for promotions and raising awareness".

Production was handled by 9th Wonder, Khrysis, 10 for the Triad, Illmind, Masse, MoSS, P.F. Cuttin' and Tommy Tee. It features guest appearances from Rock, Buckshot, Block McCloud, Chaundon, Flood, Phonte, Ruste Juxx, Sadat X, Skyzoo, Steele and the Loudmouf Choir.

The album peaked at number 196 on the Billboard 200 and number 60 on the Top R&B/Hip-Hop Albums in the United States.

Critical reception

Jesus Price Supastar was met with generally favorable reviews. At Album of the Year, which assigns a normalized rating out of 100 to reviews from mainstream publications, the album received an average score of 72, based on six reviews.

Accolades

Track listing

Charts

References

External links

2007 albums
Sean Price albums
Duck Down Music albums
Albums produced by MoSS
Albums produced by Illmind
Albums produced by Khrysis
Albums produced by 9th Wonder